Campbell Mountain is a mountain located in the Catskill Mountains of New York southeast of Downsville, New York. Sugarloaf Mountain is located of Campbell Mountain and Brock Mountain is located east.

References

Mountains of Delaware County, New York
Mountains of New York (state)